County Waterford was a parliamentary constituency in Ireland, represented in the British House of Commons.

Boundaries and boundary changes
This constituency comprised County Waterford, except for the parliamentary boroughs of Dungarvan (1801–1885) and Waterford City (1801–1885 and 1918–1922). It returned two Members of Parliament 1801–1885 and one 1918–1922.

It was an original constituency represented in Parliament when the Union of Great Britain and Ireland took effect on 1 January 1801.

Between 1885 and 1918 the area had been divided between the constituencies of East Waterford and West Waterford. From 1922 it was no longer represented in the House of Commons of the United Kingdom.

Politics
In the 1918 election Sinn Féin defeated by 3 to 1 the Nationalist candidate J. J. O'Shee representing the Irish Parliamentary Party.

The newly elected Sinn Féin MP for the constituency was Cathal Brugha. Like other Sinn Féin MPs elected that year, he did not take his seat at Westminster but instead, took a seat in the revolutionary First Dáil which assembled in Dublin on 21 January 1919. As better known figures were under arrest, Brugha became the first presiding officer (with the title of Ceann Comhairle) and a day later the first head of government (with the title of President of Dáil Éireann), of the Irish Republic.

The First Dáil
Sinn Féin contested the general election of 1918 on the platform that instead of taking up any seats they won in the United Kingdom Parliament, they would establish a revolutionary assembly in Dublin. In republican theory every MP elected in Ireland was a potential Deputy to this assembly. In practice only the Sinn Féin members accepted the offer.

The revolutionary First Dáil assembled on 21 January 1919 and last met on 10 May 1921. The First Dáil, according to a resolution passed on 10 May 1921, was formally dissolved on the assembling of the Second Dáil. This took place on 16 August 1921.

In 1921 Sinn Féin used the UK authorised elections for the Northern Ireland House of Commons and the House of Commons of Southern Ireland as a poll for the Irish Republic's Second Dáil. This area was part of the five-seat Dáil constituency of Waterford–Tipperary East.

Members of Parliament

MPs 1801–1885

MPs 1918–1922

Elections
The single-member elections in this constituency took place using the first past the post electoral system. Multi-member elections used the plurality-at-large voting system.

Elections in the 1830s
Villiers Stuart resigned, causing a by-election.

Power's death caused a by-election.

Elections in the 1840s
Power resigned by accepting the office of Steward of the Chiltern Hundreds, causing a by-election.

Elections in the 1850s

Elections in the 1860s

 
 

Esmonde was appointed a Lord Commissioner of the Treasury, causing a by-election.

 

Beresford succeeded as 5th Marquess of Waterford, causing a by-election.

Elections in the 1870s
de la Poer resigned, causing a by-election.

 
 

Esmonde's death caused a by-election.

Elections in the 1880s

 

 

Blake resigned, causing a by-election.

Elections in the 1910s

References

The Parliaments of England by Henry Stooks Smith (1st edition published in three volumes 1844–50), 2nd edition edited (in one volume) by F.W.S. Craig (Political Reference Publications 1973)

External links
 https://www.oireachtas.ie/en/members/
 https://web.archive.org/web/20060423011521/http://historical-debates.oireachtas.ie/en.toc.dail.html

See also
List of United Kingdom Parliament constituencies in Ireland and Northern Ireland
Redistribution of Seats (Ireland) Act 1918
List of MPs elected in the 1918 United Kingdom general election
Historic Dáil constituencies
Members of the 1st Dáil

Westminster constituencies in County Waterford (historic)
Dáil constituencies in the Republic of Ireland (historic)
Constituencies of the Parliament of the United Kingdom established in 1801
Constituencies of the Parliament of the United Kingdom disestablished in 1885
Constituencies of the Parliament of the United Kingdom established in 1918
Constituencies of the Parliament of the United Kingdom disestablished in 1922